De Smet Cemetery is a cemetery located southwest of the town of De Smet in Kingsbury County, South Dakota, United States. Numerous family members from the Laura Ingalls Wilder Little House books are buried there.

People buried in De Smet Cemetery 
 Robert Boast, appeared in a number of the books by Laura Ingalls Wilder
 Reverend Edward Brown, appeared in two of the books by Laura Ingalls Wilder
 Florence Garland Dawley, teacher in De Smet during the Hard Winter of 1880–81
 Caroline Ingalls, "Ma" from the "Little House" books by Laura Ingalls Wilder
 Charles Ingalls, "Pa" from the "Little House" books by Laura Ingalls Wilder
 Mary Ingalls, sister of Laura Ingalls Wilder
 Carrie Ingalls, sister of Laura Ingalls Wilder
 Grace Ingalls, sister of Laura Ingalls Wilder
 Genevieve Masters, "Nellie Oleson"
 Baby Son Wilder, son of Laura Ingalls Wilder and Almanzo Wilder

Ingalls family plot image gallery

See also
Ingalls House (De Smet, South Dakota)

External links
 De Smet, SD Cemetery: Frontier Girl Trail
  Includes links to obituaries of Little House characters
 
 Little House on the Prairie at Find a Grave
 Little House on the Prairie television show at Find a Grave
 Little House on the Prairie books at Find a Grave
 Early 1940s WPA burial listings for De Smet Cemetery at South Dakota GenWeb
  – 

Cemeteries in South Dakota
Protected areas of Kingsbury County, South Dakota
De Smet, South Dakota